The 2013 Al Habtoor Tennis Challenge was a professional tennis tournament played on outdoor hard courts. It was the fifteenth edition of the tournament which was part of the 2013 ITF Women's Circuit, offering a total of $75,000 in prize money. It took place in Dubai, United Arab Emirates, on 11–17 November 2013.

Singles entrants

Seeds 

 1 Rankings as of 4 November 2013

Other entrants 
The following players received wildcards into the singles main draw:
  Maria Elena Camerin
  Angelina Gabueva
  Kira Nagy
  Sofia Sabljarević

The following players received entry from the qualifying draw:
  Fatma Al-Nabhani
  Elena Bogdan
  Dayana Sedova
  Ekaterina Yashina

The following player received entry as a lucky loser:
  Maria Concepcion Bulilan

Champions

Singles 

  Jana Čepelová def.  Maria Elena Camerin 6–1, 6–2

Doubles 

  Vitalia Diatchenko /  Olga Savchuk def.  Lyudmyla Kichenok /  Nadiya Kichenok 7–5, 6–1

External links 
 2013 Al Habtoor Tennis Challenge at ITFtennis.com
 Official website

2013 ITF Women's Circuit
2013 Al Habtoor Tennis Challenge
2013 in Emirati tennis